Le Saulcy is a commune in the Vosges department in Grand Est in northeastern France.

History
In the nearby hamlet of Le Harcholet, a war crime was committed by Waffen SS forces under the command of Oberscharfuhrer Max Kessler. Three members of an SAS infiltration team (including Lieutenant Silly and Trooper Brown) were burnt alive whilst bound by German forces in an abandoned barn. The three soldiers had been caught attempting to cross the River Meurthe whilst trying to reach the Allied lines on the 10th October 1944 after the termination of Operation Loyton, an attempt to inspire a French uprising in the Vosges to pave the way for an offensive by General Patton's Seventh Army.

See also
Communes of the Vosges department

References

Communes of Vosges (department)
Salm-Salm